Emarginula thomasi is a species of sea snail, a marine gastropod mollusk in the family Fissurellidae, the keyhole limpets.

Description

Distribution

References

External links

Fissurellidae
Gastropods described in 1864